Have a Little Faith may refer to:
 Have a Little Faith (Joe Cocker album), 1994
 Have a Little Faith (Bill Frisell album)
 Have a Little Faith (Beverley Mahood album), 2006
 Have a Little Faith (Mavis Staples album)
 "Have a Little Faith" (David Houston song), a 1968 song written by Billy Sherrill and Glenn Sutton and recorded by David Houston
 "Have a Little Faith" (John Farnham song), a 1996 song recorded by John Farnham
 Have a Little Faith (book), a 2009 non-fiction book by Mitch Albom
 Have a Little Faith (film), a 2011 Hallmark Hall of Fame television movie
 Have a Little Faith (TV series), a 2017 Singaporean TV series
 "Have a Little Faith", a 2003 song by Gotthard from the album Human Zoo